The Charles O. Boynton Carriage House is a prominent structure in the Sycamore Historic District, located in Sycamore, Illinois. The Sycamore Historic District was added to the National Register of Historic Places in 1978. The Carriage House is considered one of more than 150 contributing properties to the overall historic integrity of the district.

History
The carriage house was built at the same time as the Queen Anne residence, next door, of Sycamore businessman and land speculator, Charles O. Boynton, in 1887. The home and the carriage house were held as one property until the Charles O. Boynton House was sold out of the Boynton family in 1986. At that time the building was converted for use as office space, a function it still served in 2007.

References

Buildings and structures in Sycamore Historic District
Carriage houses in the United States
Houses completed in 1887
Historic district contributing properties in Illinois
National Register of Historic Places in DeKalb County, Illinois
Carriage houses on the National Register of Historic Places
Transportation buildings and structures on the National Register of Historic Places in Illinois